Nathan Fellows Dixon (May 1, 1812 – April 11, 1881) was an attorney and bank president from Westerly, Rhode Island.  The son of Nathan F. Dixon and father of Nathan F. Dixon III, he was best known for his service as a United States representative from Rhode Island from 1849 to 1851, and again from 1863 to 1871.

Biography
He was born in Westerly, Rhode Island on May 1, 1812, the son of Nathan F. Dixon and Elizabeth (Palmer) Dixon).  He attended Plainfield Academy in Plainfield, Connecticut, and  graduated from Brown University in 1833.  He later pursued the study of law at Harvard Law School and Yale Law School.  Dixon was admitted to the bar in 1837 and commenced practice in Westerly.  He was a member of the board of directors of Westerly's Washington Bank, and succeeded his father as president when the senior Dixon died in 1842.  He served as president of the bank until his death.

He was a member of the Rhode Island House of Representatives from 1841 to 1849 and 1851 to 1854.  He was appointed a member of the Rhode Island Governor's council in 1842, one of a committee of legislators who advised Whig Governor Samuel Ward King as the state coped with an anti-government uprising by Democrats known as the Dorr Rebellion.  In 1844, Dixon was a presidential elector from Rhode Island; the Whigs lost the national election but carried the state, and he cast his ballot for the Whig ticket of Henry Clay and Theodore Frelinghuysen.

He was elected as a Whig to the 31st Congress (March 4, 1849 – March 3, 1851).  He was not a candidate for renomination in 1850.  From 1858 to 1862 he served again in the Rhode Island House.  Dixon was elected as a Republican to the 38th Congress.  He was reelected three times, and served from March 4, 1863 to March 3, 1871.  In his final term, Dixon was chairman on the Committee on Commerce.  He was elected delegate to the 1866 National Union Convention in Philadelphia.  He declined to be a candidate for reelection to Congress in 1870.

He served in the Rhode Island House again from 1871 to 1877.  In January 1875 he was a leading candidate for the Republican nomination for U.S. Senator, but withdrew when the party's caucus in the state legislature deadlocked, which enabled the election of Ambrose E. Burnside.  In March, he was a contender for the Republican nomination for governor, but withdrew in favor of Henry Lippitt.  When none of the candidates received a majority in the general election, as required by the state constitution, Lippitt was elected governor by a vote of the state legislature.

Death and burial
Dixon died in Westerly on April 11, 1881.  He was buried at River Bend Cemetery in Westerly.

Family
In 1843, Dixon married Harriet Palmer Swan (1816–1896) of Stonington, Connecticut.  They were the parents of six children: Nathan (b. 1845, died young); Nathan Fellows (1847–1897); Edward Hazard (1849–1991); Phebe Ann (1852–1941), the wife of James Gore King McClure; Walter P. (1855–1913); and Harriet Swan (1859–1899).

References

External links

1812 births
1881 deaths
Members of the Rhode Island House of Representatives
People from Westerly, Rhode Island
Brown University alumni
Dixon family
Rhode Island Whigs
Whig Party members of the United States House of Representatives
Republican Party members of the United States House of Representatives from Rhode Island
19th-century American politicians